Type 1 diabetes, also known as juvenile diabetes, is a condition in which the body does not produce insulin, resulting in high levels of sugar in the bloodstream. Whereas type 2 diabetes is typically diagnosed in middle age and treated via diet, oral medication and/or insulin therapy, type 1 diabetes tends to be diagnosed earlier in life, and people with type 1 diabetes require insulin therapy for survival. It is significantly less common than type 2 diabetes, accounting for 5 percent of all diabetes diagnoses.

This list of notable people with type 1 diabetes includes writers, artists, athletes, entertainers, and others who have been documented as having type 1 diabetes.

List of people

See also
Diabetes mellitus type 1
List of sportspeople with diabetes

References

External links
 Type 1 diabetes at the American Diabetes Association
 Type 1 diabetes at the Mayo Clinic
 Natural History of Type 1 Diabetes: Academic article chronicling type 1 diabetes through history

Diabetes mellitus type 1, List of people with